"Sex" is a song by American DJ trio Cheat Codes and Dutch DJ trio Kris Kross Amsterdam. The song was released by Spinnin' Records on February 19, 2016, and has since achieved international success.

Composition and release
The song re-uses the chorus from the 1991 single "Let's Talk About Sex" by hip hop trio Salt-n-Pepa. It is set in the key of A minor and has a tempo of 105 beats per minute.

The song was first released by Spinnin' Records on February 19, 2016. This was followed by a release as a digital download to Beatport on April 8, 2016, and a release to the iTunes Store by Casablanca Records on May 26, 2016.

Music video
The song's music video was released to the Spinnin' Records YouTube channel on February 19, 2016. Directed by Chris Campbell, it features Cheat Codes and Kris Kross Amsterdam in a sex education class. As of October 1, 2017, the video has received over 100 million views.

Track listing

Charts

Weekly charts

Year-end charts

Certifications

References

2016 singles
2016 songs
Cheat Codes (DJs) songs
Spinnin' Records singles
Songs written by Hurby Azor
Tropical house songs